The 2006 Philadelphia Phillies season was the 124th season in the history of the franchise.  The Phillies finished in second place in the National League East, 12 games behind the New York Mets, and three games behind the Los Angeles Dodgers in the NL Wild-Card race.  The Phillies, managed by Charlie Manuel, played their home games at Citizens Bank Park.  Phillies first baseman Ryan Howard was the National League's Most Valuable Player for the 2006 season, and was the winner of the Century 21 Home Run Derby, held during the All-Star Break at Pittsburgh.

Offseason
 November 25, 2005: Jim Thome was traded by the Phillies with cash to the Chicago White Sox for a player to be named later, Aaron Rowand, and Daniel Haigwood (minors). The White Sox sent Gio González (minors) (December 8, 2005) to the Phillies to complete the trade.
March 1, 2006: Alex Gonzalez was signed as a free agent with the Phillies.

Regular season

Season standings

National League East

Record vs. opponents

Transactions
May 21, 2006: Alex Gonzalez retired from the Phillies. 
July 28, 2006: David Bell was traded by the Phillies to the Milwaukee Brewers for Wilfrido Laureano (minors).
July 30, 2006: Bobby Abreu and Cory Lidle were traded by the Phillies to the New York Yankees for minor league prospects.
September 1, 2006: Randall Simon was purchased by the Phillies from the Texas Rangers.

Game log

|- style="background:#fbb"
| 1 || April 3 || Cardinals || 5–13 || Chris Carpenter (1–0) || Jon Lieber (0–1) || None || 44,614 || 0–1
|- style="background:#fbb"
| 2 || April 5 || Cardinals || 3–4 || Brad Thompson (1–0) || Tom Gordon (0–1) || Jason Isringhausen (1) || 20,557 || 0–2
|- style="background:#fbb"
| 3 || April 6 || Cardinals || 2–4 || Jason Marquis (1–0) || Cory Lidle (0–1) || Jason Isringhausen (2) || 20,413 || 0–3
|- style="background:#fbb"
| 4 || April 7 || Dodgers || 3–5 || Brett Tomko (1–0) || Gavin Floyd (0–1) || Danys Báez (2) || 25,518 || 0–4
|- style="background:#bbb"
| – || April 8 || Dodgers || colspan=6 | Postponed (rain); 
|- style="background:#bfb"
| 5 || April 9  || Dodgers || 6–3 || Tom Gordon (1–1) || Tim Hamulack (0–1) || None ||  || 1–4
|- style="background:#fbb"
| 6 || April 9  || Dodgers || 2–6 || Brad Penny (2–0) || Jon Lieber (0–2) || None || 38,056 || 1–5
|- style="background:#fbb"
| 7 || April 10 || @ Braves || 3–5 || Óscar Villarreal (3–0) || Ryan Franklin (0–1) || Chris Reitsma (3) || 47,332 || 1–6
|- style="background:#bfb"
| 8 || April 12 || @ Braves || 7–5 || Cory Lidle (1–1) || Jorge Sosa (0–2) || Tom Gordon (1) || 37,107 || 2–6
|- style="background:#bfb"
| 9 || April 13 || @ Braves || 7–6 || Gavin Floyd (1–1) || Kyle Davies (0–1) || Tom Gordon (2) || 22,911 || 3–6
|- style="background:#bfb"
| 10 || April 14 || @ Rockies || 10–8 || Ryan Madson (1–0) || Zach Day (1–1) || Tom Gordon (3) || 25,390 || 4–6
|- style="background:#fbb"
| 11 || April 15 || @ Rockies || 6–10 || Ray King (1–1) || Jon Lieber (0–3) || None || 23,206 || 4–7
|- style="background:#bfb"
| 12 || April 16 || @ Rockies || 1–0 || Brett Myers (1–0) || Aaron Cook (1–2) || Tom Gordon (4) || 25,144 || 5–7
|- style="background:#fbb"
| 13 || April 18 || Nationals || 3–10 || Tony Armas Jr. (1–2) || Cory Lidle (1–2) || None || 20,072 || 5–8
|- style="background:#bfb"
| 14 || April 19 || Nationals || 7–6  || Ryan Franklin (1–1) || Mike Stanton (0–2) || None || 27,913 || 6–8
|- style="background:#fbb"
| 15 || April 20 || Nationals || 4–10 || Billy Traber (1–0) || Ryan Madson (1–1) || None || 28,177 || 6–9
|- style="background:#fbb"
| 16 || April 21 || Marlins || 3–4 || Scott Olsen (1–1) || Jon Lieber (0–4) || Joe Borowski (2) || 20,227 || 6–10
|- style="background:#bbb"
| – || April 22 || Marlins || colspan=6 | Postponed (rain); 
|- style="background:#bfb"
| 17 || April 23 || Marlins || 4–2 || Brett Myers (2–0) || Sergio Mitre (1–2) || Tom Gordon (5)|| 40,383 || 7–10
|- style="background:#bfb"
| 18 || April 24 || Rockies || 6–5 || Cory Lidle (2–2) || Josh Fogg (2–1) || Tom Gordon (6) || 20,244 || 8–10
|- style="background:#fbb"
| 19 || April 25 || Rockies || 6–7 || Ramón Ramírez (1–0) || Gavin Floyd (1–2) || Brian Fuentes (3) || 19,512 || 8–11
|- style="background:#bfb"
| 20 || April 26 || Rockies || 9–5 || Ryan Madson (2–1) || Jason Jennings (1–1) || None (9) || 19,182 || 9–11
|- style="background:#fbb"
| 21 || April 27 || Rockies || 3–6 || Aaron Cook (2–3) || Ryan Franklin (1–2) || Brian Fuentes (4) || 21,506 || 9–12
|- style="background:#fbb"
| 22 || April 28 || @ Pirates || 1–3 || Ian Snell (1–2) || Brett Myers (2–1) || Michael Gonzalez (3) || 30,568 || 9–13
|- style="background:#fbb"
| 23 || April 29 || @ Pirates || 2–3 || Paul Maholm (1–3) || Cory Lidle (2–3) || Roberto Hernández (2) || 33,944 || 9–14
|- style="background:#bfb"
| 24 || April 30 || @ Pirates || 5–1 || Gavin Floyd (2–2) || Óliver Pérez (1–4) || None || 22,320 || 10–14

|- style="background:#bfb"
| 25 || May 1 || @ Marlins || 8–5 || Rhéal Cormier (1–0) || Dontrelle Willis (1–2) || Tom Gordon (7) || 6,017 || 11–14
|- style="background:#bfb"
| 26 || May 2 || @ Marlins || 7–5 || Jon Lieber (1–4) || Ricky Nolasco (1–1) || Tom Gordon (8) || 6,652 || 12–14
|- style="background:#bfb"
| 27 || May 3 || Braves || 5–4 || Rhéal Cormier (2–0) || Mike Remlinger (1–2) || Tom Gordon (9) || 26,443 || 13–14
|- style="background:#bfb"
| 28 || May 4 || Braves || 6–3 || Cory Lidle (3–3) || John Thomson (0–2) || Arthur Rhodes (1) || 24,842 || 14–14
|- style="background:#bfb"
| 29 || May 5 || Giants || 8–3 || Gavin Floyd (3–2) || Matt Cain (1–4) || None || 37,269 || 15–14
|- style="background:#bfb"
| 30 || May 6 || Giants || 4–1 || Ryan Madson (3–1) || Jamey Wright (2–3) || Tom Gordon (10) || 44,042 || 16–14
|- style="background:#bfb"
| 31 || May 7 || Giants || 9–5 || Jon Lieber (2–4) || Matt Morris (2–3) || None || 39,315 || 17–14
|- style="background:#bfb"
| 32 || May 9 || Mets || 5–4 || Tom Gordon (2–1) || Aaron Heilman (0–1) || None || 33,787 || 18–14
|- style="background:#fbb"
| 33 || May 10 || Mets || 4–13 || Tom Glavine (5–2) || Cory Lidle (3–4) || None || 30,269 || 18–15
|- style="background:#bfb"
| 34 || May 11 || Mets || 2–0  || Gavin Floyd (4–2) || Steve Trachsel (2–3) || None (4) || 28,224 || 19–15
|- style="background:#bfb"
| 35 || May 12 || @ Reds || 8–4 || Ryan Madson (4–1) || Elizardo Ramírez (1–3) || Tom Gordon (11) || 21,705 || 20–15
|- style="background:#bfb"
| 36 || May 13 || @ Reds || 2–0 || Jon Lieber (3–4) || Dave Williams (2–3) || Tom Gordon (12) || 32,624 || 21–15
|- style="background:#bfb"
| 37 || May 14 || @ Reds || 2–1  || Geoff Geary (1–0) || Chris Hammond (0–1) || Tom Gordon (13) || 19,676 || 22–15
|- style="background:#fbb"
| 38 || May 16 || @ Brewers || 2–3 || Derrick Turnbow (1–1) || Ryan Franklin (1–3) || None || 14,592 || 22–16
|- style="background:#fbb"
| 39 || May 17 || @ Brewers || 7–8 || José Capellán (1–0) || Arthur Rhodes (0–1) || None || 20,874 || 22–17
|- style="background:#fbb"
| 40 || May 18 || @ Brewers || 4–5 || Justin Lehr (2–1) || Ryan Madson (4–2) || Derrick Turnbow (13) || 27,419 || 22–18
|- style="background:#fbb"
| 41 || May 19 || Red Sox || 3–5 || Matt Clement (4–3) || Jon Lieber (3–5) || Jonathan Papelbon (15) || 44,296 || 22–19
|- style="background:#fbb"
| 42 || May 20 || Red Sox ||  4–8 || Josh Beckett (6–1) || Brett Myers (2–2) || None || 44,809 || 22–20
|- style="background:#bfb"
| 43 || May 21 || Red Sox || 10–5 || Cory Lidle (4–4) || Lenny DiNardo (1–2) || None || 44,738 || 23–20
|- style="background:#fbb"
| 44 || May 23 || @ Mets || 8–9  || Darren Oliver (2–0) || Ryan Madson (4–3) || None || 28,948 || 23–21
|- style="background:#fbb"
| 45 || May 24 || @ Mets || 4–5 || Pedro Feliciano (1–0) || Rhéal Cormier (2–1) || Billy Wagner (10) || 32,094 || 23–22
|- style="background:#bfb"
| 46 || May 25 || @ Mets || 5–3 || Brett Myers (3–2) || Pedro Feliciano (1–1) || Tom Gordon (14) || 51,365 || 24–22
|- style="background:#fbb"
| 47 || May 26 || Brewers || 5–6  || Derrick Turnbow (2–1) || Tom Gordon (2–2) || Brian Shouse (1) || 43,852 || 24–23
|- style="background:#fbb"
| 48 || May 27 || Brewers || 6–9 || Matt Wise (3–2) || Ryan Franklin (1–4) || Derrick Turnbow (15) || 32,089 || 24–24
|- style="background:#bfb"
| 49 || May 28 || Brewers || 6–2 || Ryan Madson (5–3) || Dana Eveland (0–2) || None || 35,674 || 25–24
|- style="background:#bfb"
| 50 || May 29 || Nationals || 11–2 || Clay Condrey (1–0) || Michael O'Connor (2–3) || None (10) || 33,682 || 26–24
|- style="background:#bfb"
| 51 || May 30 || Nationals || 4–2 || Brett Myers (4–2) || Tony Armas Jr. (5–3) || Tom Gordon (15) || 23,805 || 27–24
|- style="background:#fbb"
| 52 || May 31 || Nationals || 2–3 || Liván Hernández (4–5) || Cory Lidle (4–5) || Chad Cordero (8) || 30,386 || 27–25

|- style="background:#fbb"
| 53 || June 1 || @ Dodgers || 2–7 || Derek Lowe (4–3) || Gavin Floyd (4–3) || None || 38,643 || 27–26
|- style="background:#bfb"
| 54 || June 2 || @ Dodgers || 8–6 || Geoff Geary (2–0) || Danys Báez (3–3) || Tom Gordon (16) || 55,142 || 28–26
|- style="background:#fbb"
| 55 || June 3 || @ Dodgers || 2–8 || Brad Penny (6–1) || Eude Brito (0–1) || None || 46,561 || 28–27
|- style="background:#bfb"
| 56 || June 4 || @ Dodgers || 6–4 || Geoff Geary (3–0) || Joe Beimel (2–1) || Tom Gordon (17) || 48,270 || 29–27
|- style="background:#bfb"
| 57 || June 5 || @ Diamondbacks || 4–3 || Aaron Fultz (1–0) || Brandon Lyon (1–1) || Tom Gordon (18) || 20,647 || 30–27
|- style="background:#bfb"
| 58 || June 6 || @ Diamondbacks || 10–1 || Cole Hamels (1–0) || Russ Ortiz (0–4) || None || 22,677 || 31–27
|- style="background:#bfb"
| 59 || June 7 || @ Diamondbacks || 7–3 || Ryan Madson (6–3) || Dustin Nippert (0–1) || None || 21,052 || 32–27
|- style="background:#fbb"
| 60 || June 8 || @ Nationals || 2–5 || Michael O'Connor (3–3) || Eude Brito (0–2) || Chad Cordero (12) || 24,669 || 32–28
|- style="background:#fbb"
| 61 || June 9 || @ Nationals || 8–9  || Chad Cordero (2–1) || Clay Condrey (1–1) || None || 24,751 || 32–29
|- style="background:#bfb"
| 62 || June 10 || @ Nationals || 6–2 || Geoff Geary (4–0) || Liván Hernández (5–6) || None || 32,089 || 33–29
|- style="background:#fbb"
| 63 || June 11 || @ Nationals || 0–6 || Shawn Hill (1–1) || Cole Hamels (1–1) || None || 30,583 || 33–30
|- style="background:#fbb"
| 64 || June 13 || Mets || 7–9 || Chad Bradford (3–2) || Ryan Madson (6–4) || Billy Wagner (13) || 37,964 || 33–31
|- style="background:#fbb"
| 65 || June 14 || Mets || 3–9 || Darren Oliver (3–0) || Brett Myers (4–3) || None || 38,811 || 33–32
|- style="background:#fbb"
| 66 || June 15 || Mets || 4–5 || Steve Trachsel (4–4) || Cory Lidle (4–6) || Billy Wagner (14) || 45,102 || 33–33
|- style="background:#fbb"
| 67 || June 16 || Devil Rays || 4–10 || James Shields (3–0) || Cole Hamels (1–2) || None || 31,042 || 33–34
|- style="background:#fbb"
| 68 || June 17 || Devil Rays || 2–7 || Scott Kazmir (8–4) || Scott Mathieson (0–1) || None || 35,939 || 33–35
|- style="background:#bfb"
| 69 || June 18 || Devil Rays || 8–5 || Ryan Madson (7–4) || Seth McClung (2–10) || Tom Gordon (19) || 42,658 || 34–35
|- style="background:#bfb"
| 70 || June 19 || Yankees || 4–2 || Brett Myers (5–3) || Randy Johnson (8–6) || Tom Gordon (20) || 44,747 || 35–35
|- style="background:#fbb"
| 71 || June 20 || Yankees || 7–9 || T. J. Beam (1–0) || Arthur Rhodes (0–2) || Mariano Rivera (14) || 44,775 || 35–36
|- style="background:#fbb"
| 72 || June 21 || Yankees || 0–5 || Jaret Wright (4–4) || Cole Hamels (1–3) || None || 45,111 || 35–37
|- style="background:#fbb"
| 73 || June 23 || @ Red Sox || 2–10 || Josh Beckett (9–3) || Ryan Madson (7–5) || None || 35,948 || 35–38
|- style="background:#fbb"
| 74 || June 24 || @ Red Sox || 3–5  || Jonathan Papelbon (2–1) || Tom Gordon (2–3) || None || 35,564 || 35–39
|- style="background:#bbb"
| – || June 25 || @ Red Sox || colspan=6 | Postponed (rain); 
|- style="background:#fbb"
| 75 || June 26 || @ Red Sox || 7–8  || Craig Hansen (1–0) || Clay Condrey (1–2) || None || 36,459 || 35–40
|- style="background:#bbb"
| – || June 27 || @ Orioles || colspan=6 | Postponed (rain); 
|- style="background:#fbb"
| 76 || June 28  || @ Orioles || 4–7 || Érik Bédard (8–6) || Cole Hamels (1–4)  || Chris Ray (20) || 20,633 || 35–41
|- style="background:#fbb"
| 77 || June 28  || @ Orioles || 5–12 || Kris Benson (9–5) || Scott Mathieson (0–2) || None || 26,228 || 35–42
|- style="background:#bfb"
| 78 || June 29 || @ Orioles || 4–0 || Ryan Madson (8–5) || Rodrigo López (5–9)  || Tom Gordon (21) || 31,038 || 36–42
|- style="background:#fbb"
| 79 || June 30 || @ Blue Jays || 1–8 || Casey Janssen (6–6) || Adam Bernero (0–1) || None || 17,311 || 36–43

|- style="background:#fbb"
| 80 || July 1 || @ Blue Jays || 2–5 || Scott Downs (2–0) || Cory Lidle (4–7) || B. J. Ryan  (22) || 24,248 || 36–44
|- style="background:#bfb"
| 81 || July 2 || @ Blue Jays || 11–6 || Geoff Geary (5–0) || A. J. Burnett (1–2) || None || 26,177 || 37–44
|- style="background:#bfb"
| 82 || July 4 || Padres || 6–5 || Tom Gordon (3–3) || Cla Meredith (1–1) || None || 29,192 || 38–44
|- style="background:#fbb"
| 83 || July 5 || Padres || 3–6 || Scott Linebrink (6–2) || Arthur Rhodes (0–3) || Trevor Hoffman (21) || 40,230 || 38–45
|- style="background:#fbb"
| 84 || July 6 || Padres || 3–5 || Chan Ho Park (6–4) || Ryan Madson (8–6) || Trevor Hoffman (22) || 30,261 || 38–46
|- style="background:#fbb"
| 85 || July 7 || Pirates || 2–3 || Ian Snell (8–6) || Jon Lieber (3–6) || Michael Gonzalez (13) || 45,025 || 38–47
|- style="background:#bfb"
| 86 || July 8 || Pirates || 6–2 || Cory Lidle (5–7) || Paul Maholm (3–8) || None || 37,462 || 39–47
|- style="background:#bfb"
| 87 || July 9 || Pirates || 8–3 || Cole Hamels (2–4) || Zach Duke (5–8) || None ||  32,527 || 40–47
|- style="background:#bbcaff;"
| – || July 11 ||colspan=7 |2006 Major League Baseball All-Star Game at PNC Park in Pittsburgh
|- style="background:#fbb"
| 88 || July 14 || @ Giants || 3–5 || Matt Morris (8–7) || Jon Lieber (3–7) || Armando Benítez (11) || 38,009 || 40–48
|- style="background:#bfb"
| 89 || July 15 || @ Giants || 14–6 || Cory Lidle (6–7) || Noah Lowry (4–6) || None || 41,401 || 41–48
|- style="background:#bfb"
| 90 || July 16 || @ Giants || 6–2 || Brett Myers (6–3) || Steve Kline (2–2) || None || 38,241 || 42–48
|- style="background:#fbb"
| 91 || July 17 || @ Padres || 6–8 || Alan Embree (3–2) || Rhéal Cormier (2–2) || Trevor Hoffman (25) || 25,936 || 42–49
|- style="background:#fbb"
| 92 || July 18 || @ Padres || 6–10 || Clay Hensley (6–7) || Ryan Madson (8–7) || None || 33,327 || 42–50
|- style="background:#bfb"
| 93 || July 19 || @ Padres || 5–4 || Geoff Geary (6–0) || Trevor Hoffman (0–2) || Tom Gordon (22) || 32,101 || 43–50
|- style="background:#bfb"
| 94 || July 21 || Braves || 6–5 || Cory Lidle (7–7) || Ken Ray (1–1) || Tom Gordon (23) || 32,833 || 44–50
|- style="background:#bbb"
| – || July 22 || Braves || colspan=6 | Postponed (rain); 
|- style="background:#fbb"
| 95 || July 23 || Braves || 1–5 || Macay McBride (2–1) || Brett Myers (6–4) || None || 31,664 || 44–51
|- style="background:#fbb"
| 96 || July 24 || Braves || 8–10 || Tim Hudson (8–8) || Cole Hamels (2–5) || Bob Wickman (16) || 28,864 || 44–52
|- style="background:#fbb"
| 97 || July 25 || Diamondbacks || 5–6  || Tony Peña (1–0) || Ryan Franklin (1–5) || None || 24,499 || 44–53
|- style="background:#bfb"
| 98 || July 26 || Diamondbacks || 6–4 || Jon Lieber (4–7) || Brandon Webb (11–4) || Tom Gordon (24) || 45,459 || 45–53
|- style="background:#bfb"
| 99 || July 27 || Diamondbacks || 5–2 || Cory Lidle (8–7) || Claudio Vargas (8–7) || Tom Gordon (25) || 31,752 || 46–53
|- style="background:#fbb"
| 100 || July 28 || Marlins || 1–4 || Ricky Nolasco (9–6) || Brett Myers (6–5) || None || 25,105 || 46–54
|- style="background:#bfb"
| 101 || July 29 || Marlins || 12–3 || Cole Hamels (3–5) || Dontrelle Willis (6–8) || None || 31,072 || 47–54
|- style="background:#bfb"
| 102 || July 30  || Marlins || 11–5 || Aaron Fultz (2–0) || Aníbal Sánchez (4–1) || None || 31,375 || 48–54
|- style="background:#bfb"
| 103 || July 30  || Marlins || 9–2 || Ryan Madson (9–7) || Brian Moehler (5–8) || None || 23,604 || 49–54
|- style="background:#fbb"
| 104 || July 31 || Marlins || 2–15 || Josh Johnson (9–5) || Jon Lieber (4–8) || None || 20,956 || 49–55

|- style="background:#bfb"
| 105 || August 1 || @ Cardinals || 5–3 || Scott Mathieson (1–2) || Jeff Suppan (8–6) || Tom Gordon (26) || 42,773 || 50–55
|- style="background:#bfb"
| 106 || August 2 || @ Cardinals || 16–8 || Brett Myers (7–5) || Jeff Weaver (4–12) || None (33) || 42,598 || 51–55
|- style="background:#bfb"
| 107 || August 3 || @ Cardinals || 8–1 || Cole Hamels (4–5) || Jason Marquis (12–9) || None (34) || 42,461 || 52–55
|- style="background:#bfb"
| 108 || August 4 || @ Mets || 5–3 || Ryan Madson (10–7) || Darren Oliver (4–1) || Tom Gordon (27) || 43,209 || 53–55
|- style="background:#fbb"
| 109 || August 5 || @ Mets || 3–4 || Tom Glavine (12–4) || Jon Lieber (4–9) || Billy Wagner (24) || 44,829 || 53–56
|- style="background:#fbb"
| 110 || August 6 || @ Mets || 1–8 || John Maine (2–3) || Scott Mathieson (1–3) || None || 39,144 || 53–57
|- style="background:#bfb"
| 111 || August 7 || @ Braves || 9–6 || Brett Myers (8–5) || Horacio Ramírez (5–5) || None || 26,177 || 54–57
|- style="background:#fbb"
| 112 || August 8 || @ Braves || 1–3 || Tim Hudson (9–10) || Cole Hamels (4–6) || Bob Wickman (21) || 30,714 || 54–58
|- style="background:#bfb"
| 113 || August 9 || @ Braves || 9–3 || Rick White (2–0) || Tyler Yates (1–3) || None || 27,222 || 55–58
|- style="background:#bfb"
| 114 || August 11 || Reds || 6–5  || Aaron Fultz (3–0) || Elizardo Ramírez (4–9) || None || 41,461 || 56–58
|- style="background:#fbb"
| 115 || August 12 || Reds || 7–9 || Chris Michalak (1–0) || Tom Gordon (3–4) || Eddie Guardado (13) || 39,553 || 56–59
|- style="background:#fbb"
| 116 || August 13 || Reds || 5–7  || Bill Bray (3–2) || Ryan Madson (10–8) || None || 37,677 || 56–60
|- style="background:#bfb"
| 117 || August 14 || Mets || 13–0 || Cole Hamels (5–6) || Pedro Martínez (9–5) || None || 36,888 || 57–60
|- style="background:#bfb"
| 118 || August 15 || Mets || 11–4 || Randy Wolf (1–0) || Orlando Hernández (8–9) || None || 40,283 || 58–60
|- style="background:#bfb"
| 119 || August 16 || Mets || 3–0 || Jon Lieber (5–9) || Tom Glavine (12–6) || None || 42,156 || 59–60
|- style="background:#fbb"
| 120 || August 17 || Mets || 2–7 || John Maine (3–3) || Scott Mathieson (1–4) || None || 45,775 || 59–61
|- style="background:#fbb"
| 121 || August 18 || Nationals || 4–6 || Tony Armas Jr. (8–8) || Brett Myers (8–6) || Chad Cordero (23) || 30,123 || 59–62
|- style="background:#bfb"
| 122 || August 19 || Nationals || 11–2 || Cole Hamels (6–6) || Ramón Ortiz (9–11) || None || 34,881 || 60–62
|- style="background:#bfb"
| 123 || August 20 || Nationals || 12–10 || Randy Wolf (2–0) || Pedro Astacio (3–3) || Arthur Rhodes (2) || 36,023 || 61–62
|- style="background:#bfb"
| 124 || August 21 || @ Cubs || 6–5 || Jon Lieber (6–9) || Rich Hill (3–6) || Arthur Rhodes (3) || 38,950 || 62–62
|- style="background:#bfb"
| 125 || August 22 || @ Cubs || 6–3 || Jamie Moyer (7–12) || Ryan O'Malley (1–1) || Ryan Madson (1) || 38,770 || 63–62
|- style="background:#bfb"
| 126 || August 23 || @ Cubs || 2–1 || Brett Myers (9–6) || Bob Howry (3–4) || Geoff Geary (1) || 39,470 || 64–62
|- style="background:#fbb"
| 127 || August 24 || @ Cubs || 2–11 || Carlos Zambrano (14–5) || Cole Hamels (6–7) || None || 39,464 || 64–63
|- style="background:#bfb"
| 128 || August 25 || @ Mets || 4–3 || Randy Wolf (3–0) || Brian Bannister (2–1) || Ryan Madson (2) || 41,707 || 65–63
|- style="background:#fbb"
| 129 || August 26 || @ Mets || 5–11 || Pedro Feliciano (6–2) || Rick White (2–1) || None || 47,019 || 65–64
|- style="background:#bbb"
| – || August 27 || @ Mets || colspan=6 | Postponed (rain); 
|- style="background:#fbb"
| 130 || August 28 || @ Mets || 3–8 || John Maine (4–3) || Jamie Moyer (7–13) || None || 45,868 || 65–65
|- style="background:#bfb"
| 131 || August 29 || @ Nationals || 10–6 || Brett Myers (10–6) || Tony Armas Jr. (8–10) || Arthur Rhodes (4) || 25,735 || 66–65
|- style="background:#bfb"
| 132 || August 30 || @ Nationals || 5–1 || Cole Hamels (7–7) || Ramón Ortiz (9–12) || None || 24,438 || 67–65
|- style="background:#fbb"
| 133 || August 31 || @ Nationals || 5–6  || Ryan Wagner (2–2) || Aaron Fultz (3–1) || None || 22,221 || 67–66

|- style="background:#bbb"
| – || September 1 || Braves || colspan=6 | Postponed (rain); 
|- style="background:#fbb"
| 134 || September 2  || Braves || 3–4 || Tyler Yates (2–4) || Arthur Rhodes (0–4) || Bob Wickman (26) || 31,717 || 67–67
|- style="background:#bfb"
| 135 || September 2  || Braves || 16–4 || Eude Brito (1–2) || Kyle Davies (2–4) || None || 28,600 || 68–67
|- style="background:#bfb"
| 136 || September 3  || Braves || 8–7 || Geoff Geary (7–0) || Bob Wickman (1–5) || None ||  || 69–67
|- style="background:#fbb"
| 137 || September 3  || Braves || 1–3  || Chad Paronto (2–2) || Geoff Geary (7–1) || Bob Wickman (27) || 37,044 || 69–68
|- style="background:#bfb"
| 138 || September 4 || Astros || 3–2  || Rick White (3–1) || Dave Borkowski (1–2) || None || 44,674 || 70–68
|- style="background:#bbb"
| – || September 5 || Astros || colspan=6 | Postponed (rain); 
|- style="background:#fbb"
| 139 || September 6 || Astros || 3–5 || Dan Wheeler (2–5) || Ryan Madson (10–9) || Brad Lidge (30) || 33,521 || 70–69
|- style="background:#bfb"
| 140 || September 7 || @ Marlins || 14–8 || Jon Lieber (7–9) || Josh Johnson (12–7) || None || 12,712 || 71–69
|- style="background:#bfb"
| 141 || September 8 || @ Marlins || 3–2 || Jamie Moyer (8–13) || Scott Olsen (12–8) || Tom Gordon (28) || 21,432 || 72–69
|- style="background:#fbb"
| 142 || September 9 || @ Marlins || 3–4  || Chris Resop (1–0) || Arthur Rhodes (0–5) || None || 27,444 || 72–70
|- style="background:#fbb"
| 143 || September 10 || @ Marlins || 0–3 || Dontrelle Willis (10–11) || Cole Hamels (7–8) || None || 20,308 || 72–71
|- style="background:#bbb"
| – || September 12 || @ Braves || colspan=6 | Postponed (rain); 
|- style="background:#bfb"
| 144 || September 13  || @ Braves || 6–5 || Rick White (4–1) || Chad Paronto (2–3) || Tom Gordon (29) ||  || 73–71
|- style="background:#bfb"
| 145 || September 13  || @ Braves || 7–2 || Jon Lieber (8–9) || Tim Hudson (12–11) || None || 22,239 || 74–71
|- style="background:#fbb"
| 146 || September 14 || @ Braves || 1–4 || Chuck James (10–3) || Jamie Moyer (8–14) || Bob Wickman (29) || 19,346 || 74–72
|- style="background:#bfb"
| 147 || September 15 || @ Astros || 4–3 || Brett Myers (11–6) || Roger Clemens (6–5) || Tom Gordon (30) || 41,432 || 75–72
|- style="background:#bfb"
| 148 || September 16 || @ Astros || 7–2 || Cole Hamels (8–8) || Jason Hirsh (3–4) || None || 41,002 || 76–72
|- style="background:#bfb"
| 149 || September 17 || @ Astros || 6–4 || Randy Wolf (4–0) || Wandy Rodríguez (9–10) || Tom Gordon (31) || 41,170 || 77–72
|- style="background:#fbb"
| 150 || September 18 || Cubs || 6–11 || Michael Wuertz (3–1) || Jon Lieber (8–10) || None || 31,101 || 77–73
|- style="background:#bfb"
| 151 || September 19 || Cubs || 4–1 || Jamie Moyer (9–14) || Wade Miller (0–2) || Tom Gordon (32) || 31,892 || 78–73
|- style="background:#bfb"
| 152 || September 20 || Cubs || 6–2 || Brett Myers (12–6) || Les Walrond (0–1) || None || 35,269 || 79–73
|- style="background:#bfb"
| 153 || September 22 || Marlins || 5–2 || Cole Hamels (9–8) || Ricky Nolasco (11–10) || Tom Gordon (33) || 44,737 || 80–73
|- style="background:#bfb"
| 154 || September 23 || Marlins || 8–6 || Jon Lieber (9–10) || Brian Moehler (7–10) || None || 37,055 || 81–73
|- style="background:#bfb"
| 155 || September 24 || Marlins || 10–7 || Jamie Moyer (10–14) || Scott Olsen (12–9) || None || 44,772 || 82–73
|- style="background:#fbb"
| 156 || September 25 || Astros || 4–5 || Dave Borkowski (3–2) || Matt Smith (0–1) || Dan Wheeler (8) || 44,688 || 82–74
|- style="background:#fbb"
| 157 || September 26 || @ Nationals || 3–4 || Ramón Ortiz (11–15) || Brett Myers (12–7) || Chad Cordero (29) || 18,960 || 82–75
|- style="background:#bfb"
| 158 || September 27 || @ Nationals || 8–7  || Clay Condrey (2–2) || Jason Bergmann (0–2) || Fabio Castro (1) || 21,809 || 83–75
|- style="background:#fbb"
| 159 || September 28 || @ Nationals || 1–3 || Billy Traber (4–3) || Jon Lieber (9–11) || Jon Rauch (2) || 18,324 || 83–76
|- style="background:#bfb"
| 160 || September 29 || @ Marlins || 14–2 || Jamie Moyer (11–14) || Brian Moehler (7–11) || None || 23,417 || 84–76
|- style="background:#bfb"
| 161 || September 30 || @ Marlins || 4–3 || Ryan Madson (11–9) || Scott Olsen (12–10) || Tom Gordon (34) || 20,992 || 85–76

|- style="background:#fbb"
| 162 || October 1 || @ Marlins || 2–3  || Matt Herges (2–3) || Fabio Castro (0–1) || None || 36,768 || 85–77

Roster

Awards
Ryan Howard won the Players Choice Awards MLB Player of the Year and NL Outstanding Player from his fellow players, the Sporting News Player of the Year Award, the NL Most Valuable Player Award, the NLBM Oscar Charleston Legacy Award (NL MVP), the Babe Ruth Home Run Award (in MLB), the NLBM Josh Gibson Legacy Award (NL home-run leader), the John Wanamaker Athletic Award from the Philadelphia Sports Congress (in summer 2007; for the 2006 calendar year), and the Pride of Philadelphia Award from the Philadelphia Sports Hall of Fame.

The NL Silver Slugger Award was won by Howard (first base) and Chase Utley (second base). The Philadelphia chapter of the Baseball Writers' Association of America (BBWAA) presented its annual franchise awards to Ryan Howard ("Mike Schmidt Most Valuable Player Award"), Tom Gordon ("Steve Carlton Most Valuable Pitcher Award"), Chris Coste ("Dallas Green Special Achievement Award"), and Mike Lieberthal ("Tug McGraw Good Guy Award"). Coste also received the Philadelphia Sports Writers Association's "Good Guy Award".

Player stats

Batting

Starters by position 
Note: Pos = Position; G = Games played; AB = At bats; H = Hits; Avg. = Batting average; HR = Home runs; RBI = Runs batted in

Other batters 
Note: G = Games played; AB = At bats; H = Hits; Avg. = Batting average; HR = Home runs; RBI = Runs batted in

Pitching

Starting pitchers 
Note: G = Games pitched; IP = Innings pitched; W = Wins; L = Losses; ERA = Earned run average; SO = Strikeouts

Other pitchers 
Note: G = Games pitched; IP = Innings pitched; W = Wins; L = Losses; ERA = Earned run average; SO = Strikeouts

Relief pitchers 
Note: G = Games pitched; W = Wins; L = Losses; SV = Saves; ERA = Earned run average; SO = Strikeouts

Farm system 

LEAGUE CHAMPIONS: Lakewood

References

External links
2006 Philadelphia Phillies season at Baseball Reference

Philadelphia Phillies seasons
Philadelphia Phillies season
Philadelphia Phillies
2006 in Philadelphia